Edward Dodwell (30 November 176713 May 1832) was an Irish painter, traveller and a writer on archaeology.

Biography
Dodwell was born in Ireland and belonged to the same family as Henry Dodwell, the theologian. He was educated at Trinity College, Cambridge.

Dodwell travelled from 1801 to 1806 in Greece, which was then a part of the Ottoman Empire, and spent the rest of his life for the most part in Italy, at Naples and Rome. He died in Rome from the effects of an illness contracted in 1830 during a visit of exploration to the Sabine Mountains. Dodwell's widow, a daughter of Count Giraud and thirty years his junior, subsequently became famous as the "beautiful" countess of Spaur, and played a considerable role in the political life of the papal city.

Dodwell published A Classical and Topographical Tour through Greece (1819), of which a German translation appeared in 1821; Views in Greece, with thirty colored plates (1821); and Views and Descriptions of Cyclopian or Pelasgic Remains in Italy and Greece (London and Paris, with French text, 1834).

References

External links
 
 
 Facsimile copies of the 1st editions of Dodwell's three books

1767 births
1832 deaths
Alumni of Trinity College, Cambridge
19th-century travel writers
Irish travel writers
Irish architecture writers
Painters from Dublin (city)
Writers from Dublin (city)